The 2015–16 Yale Bulldogs men's ice hockey team represented Yale University in the 2015–16 NCAA Division I men's ice hockey season. The team was coached by Keith Allain, '80, his tenth season behind the bench at Yale. His assistant coaches were Jason Guerriero, Josh Siembida, and Stephen Volek. The Bulldogs played their home games at Ingalls Rink on the campus of Yale University, competing in the ECAC.

Offseason

Seven Senior Bulldogs graduated in May: Captain Tommy Fallen – D, Anthony Day – F, Matt Killian – D, Trent Ruffolo – F, Nicholas Weberg – F, and Connor Wilson – G.

On April 22, 2015, it was announced that Senior defensemen Mitch Witek was named Captain for the 2015–16 season.

On July 6, 2015, Josh Siembida was promoted from Volunteer Goalie Coach for Yale to a full-time Assistant Coach.

On October 5, 2015, Ryan Donald, a 2010 Yale graduate and the 2009-10 Yale hockey team captain, was named Assistant Coach of the Bulldogs.

Recruiting
Yale added seven freshmen for the 2015–16 season: four forwards, two defensemen, and one goalie.

2015-16 Roster

Departures from 2014–2015 team
Anthony Day, F - Graduation
Tommy Fallen, D - Graduation
Matt Killian, D - Graduation
Trent Ruffolo, F - Graduation
Nicholas Weberg, F - Graduation
Connor Wilson, G - Graduation

2015-16 Bulldogs
As of December 22, 2015.

Coaching staff

Standings

Schedule

|-
!colspan=12 style="color:white; background:#00356B" | Exhibition

|-
!colspan=12 style="color:white; background:#00356B" | Regular Season

|-
!colspan=12 style="color:white; background:#00356B" | ECAC Tournament

|-
!colspan=12 style="color:white; background:#00356B" | NCAA Tournament

On September 21, Yale was picked to win the ECAC Hockey Title by the ECAC Hockey Media Association, with 10 first place votes.
On October 31, the Bulldogs beat Massachusetts 6-1 to win the Capital City Classic at the Sun Center.
On January 5, Yale's Ryan Hitchcock was away, representing the United States at the 2016 World Junior Ice Hockey Championships in Helsinki, Finland. The US beat Sweden 8-3 to win the bronze medal.
On January 10, the Bulldogs lost to Michigan Tech 2-1 in a shootout to finish 2nd in the inaugural Desert Hockey Classic at the Gila River Arena.
On January 30, Alex Lyon broke the school record for most wins in a career which was previously 42 by Alex Westlund.
On February 10, the ECAC suspended senior defenseman Rob O'Gara for two games due to his actions in the third period of the game against Harvard on February 6.
On March 20, the NCAA tournament Selection Committee placed Yale as the 3-seed in the East Regional at Albany, playing 1-seed UMass-Lowell in the first round.
On March 26, Yale lost to 2-seed UMass-Lowell in OT by a score of 3-2 in the first round.

Rankings

Statistics
As of the completion of the season.

Skaters

Goaltenders

Awards and honors

Preseason awards
ECAC All-League Team
Alex Lyon, G - Preseason All-League Team
Rob O'Gara, D - Preseason All-League Team

Weekly awards

ECAC Player of the Week
John Hayden, F – Week of December 15, 2015

ECAC Rookie of the Week
Joe Snively, F – Week of November 3, 2015
Joe Snively, F – Week of February 23, 2016

ECAC Goaltender of the Week
Alex Lyon, G – Week of November 3, 2015
Alex Lyon, G – Week of November 10, 2015
Alex Lyon, G – Week of February 16, 2015

American Sports Network Player of the Week
Alex Lyon, G – Week of February 9, 2016

College Hockey News Warrior Player of the Week
Alex Lyon, G – Week of February 16, 2016

Monthly awards

ECAC Rookie of the Month
Joe Snively, F – Month of January 2016

ECAC Goaltender of the Month
Alex Lyon, G – Month of January 2016
Alex Lyon, G – Month of February 2016

Postseason awards
Ivy League All-Stars
 Stu Wilson, F  – 1st Team All-Ivy
 Rob O'Gara, D – 1st Team All-Ivy
 Alex Lyon, G  – 1st Team All-Ivy
 Ryan Obuchowski, F  – 2nd Team All-Ivy
 John Hayden, F – Honorable Mention All-Ivy
 Joe Snively, F – Honorable Mention All-Ivy
 Mitch Witek, D – Honorable Mention All-Ivy

Ivy League Awards
 Joe Snively, F – Ivy League Rookie of the Year
 Keith Allain – Ivy League Coach of the Year

ECAC All-Stars
 Rob O'Gara, D – First Team All-League
 Alex Lyon, G  – First Team All-League
 Joe Snively, F – All-Rookie Team

ECAC Awards
Carson Cooper, F – Best Defensive Forward
Rob O'Gara, D – Best Defensive Defenseman
Alex Lyon, G – Ken Dryden Goaltender of the Year
Carson Cooper, F – Best Defensive Forward
Joe Snively, F – Rookie of the Year
Yale University Bulldogs – Sportsmanship Trophy

References

Yale Bulldogs men's ice hockey seasons
Yale Bulldogs
Yale
Yale Bulldogs men's ice hockey season
Yale Bulldogs men's ice hockey season